The Upper Logging Lake Snowshoe Cabin was built in 1925 in Glacier National Park.  The National Park Service Rustic as a shelter (about one day's travel, or eight to twelve miles) for rangers patrolling the backcountry. The design is similar to that used in Yellowstone National Park, which was in turn adapted from U.S. Forest Service shelters, which were themselves adaptations of trapper cabins.

References

Park buildings and structures on the National Register of Historic Places in Montana
Residential buildings completed in 1925
Log cabins in the United States
National Register of Historic Places in Flathead County, Montana
Log buildings and structures on the National Register of Historic Places in Montana
1925 establishments in Montana
National Register of Historic Places in Glacier National Park
National Park Service rustic in Montana
Residential buildings on the National Register of Historic Places in Montana